The 1980 Colorado State Rams football team was an American football team that represented Colorado State University in the Western Athletic Conference (WAC) during the 1980 NCAA Division I-A football season. In its eighth season under head coach Sark Arslanian, the team compiled a 6–4–1 record (5–1–1 against WAC opponents).

The team's statistical leaders included Steve Fairchild with 2,578 passing yards, Alvin Lewis with 1,047 rushing yards, and Tony Goolsby with 838 receiving yards.

Schedule

Team players in the NFL

References

Colorado State
Colorado State Rams football seasons
Colorado State Rams football